Sree Parabat or Sri Parabat (1 January 1927 – 2 November 2010)  was a Bengali-language novelist from Kolkata, India, known mainly for his historical novels. His novels include Ami Sirajer Begum, Mamtaz Duhita Jahanara, and Aravalli Thekey Agra. Sree Parabat is a pen-name, the actual name of the author was Prabir Kumar Goswami.

Early life and family background
He was born to Sudhir Kumar Goswami and Preetibindu Devi at his maternal grandparents' home in Cooch Behar on 1 January 1927. The Goswami family’s ancestral home was in Amla Sadarpur, Nadia district in undivided Bengal, (presently Kusthia district in Bangladesh), Both his parents belonged to a very educated and literary hindu families. On his father's side he belonged to the famous hindu Baishnava family " Advaita Parivāra " which was the 13th generation of direct descendant of Sree Sree Advaita Acharya, who was the childhood teacher and later a close associate and follower of Chaitanya. Prominent hindu social reformer Bijoy Krishna Goswami also belongs to the same holy family and was the 7th generation direct descendant of Sree Sree Advaita Acharya. Novelist and science fiction writer Rebanta Goswami was his own younger brother and Amiya Bhushan Majumdar  a well-known novelist was the first cousin of Sree Parabat on the maternal side.

The novel Ami Sirajer Begum was made into a multi-episode TV show starting from 10 December 2018.

Death
He died on 2 November 2010 at his Kolkata house. During the last 15 years of his life, he lived in the Santoshpur, Kolkata. Before that he lived in Beliaghata, Park Circus and, even before, North Kolkata.

Awards

List of major works
 1960 Ami Sirajer Begum
 1965 Aravalli Theke Agra
 1967 Mohaprem
 1971 Bahadur Shah
 1972 Mamtaz Duhita Jahanara
 1976 Ranadil
 1977 Chitor Garh
 1977 Tokhon Warren Hastings
 1981 Ranasthal Marwar
 1984 Mewar Bonhi Padmini
 1990 Murshidkuli Khan
 1990 Magadh Jugey Jugey: Rajagriha Parba
 1991 Ajodhyar Shesh Nabab
 1992 Tutankhamener Raani
 1995 Magadh Jugey Jugey: Pataliputra Parba
 1995 Mishor Samrajni Hatshepshut
 1998 Nadir Shah
 1998 Mahammad Bin Tughlaq
 1999 Karnasubarna Thekey Kanyakubja
 2000 Patabhumi Pataliputra
 2001 Sher Shah
 2002 Alauddin Khilji
 2002 Chandraketugarh
 2004 Begumer Nam Debal Ranee
 2007 Bijoynagar

Social novels
 1957 Jhor Thambey
 1960 Jey Jiban Deen
 1960 Swarnalee Sondhya
 1961 Ahir Bhoiron
 1962 Kitagarh
 1963 Em El Pampa (M. L. Pampa)
 1966 Nirjonota Nei
 1968 Jonomey Jonomey
 1969 Ami Aj Nayika
 1970 Lovers' Lane
 1972 Durjoy Durgo
 1973 Singha Dwar
 1973 Shyamal Deshey Surjo Othey
 1974 Binodinee
 1977 Safe Landing
 1988 Akhono Shiuli Jhorey
 1989 Aakasher Nichey Manush
 1994 Rajrajeswari
 1996 Moynamoti
 1997 Raja Badshah
 2001 Khuner Araley

Children's novels
 1967 Hariye Jabar Nei Mana
 1975 Era Tinjon
 1993 Raat Mohanar Rohoshyo
 1994 Girikondorey Rohoshyo

Collections of novels 
 1994 Panchalika (Contains Aami Sirajer Begum, Binodinee, Swarnalee Sandhya, Jonomey Jonomey, Shotorupey Shotobar)
 2010 Panchti Oitihashik Kahinee (Collection of five historical novels: Tutankhamener Rani, Tokhon Oaren Hastings, Rajput Nandini, Aami Sirajer Begum and Mamtaz Duhita Jahanara)

Translated novels

In Odissi
 Mumtaz Duhita Jahanara
 Ranadil

Screen adaptations
Many of Sree Parabat's works have been made into films. The film Ami Sirajer Begam was released in 1973.

References

Indian Hindus
Bengali Hindus
People from Kolkata
People from West Bengal
Indian male novelists
Bengali writers
Bengali-language writers
Indian children's writers
Bengali detective fiction writers
Scottish Church College alumni
University of Calcutta alumni
Police officers from Kolkata
1927 births
2010 deaths
20th-century Indian novelists
Novelists from West Bengal
20th-century Indian male writers
People from Cooch Behar
Writers from Kolkata
Indian male short story writers
20th-century Indian short story writers